Guilsfield ( "Hemlock-field") is a village and local government community in Montgomeryshire, Powys, Wales. It lies beside Guilsfield Brook about three miles north of Welshpool. It is located on the B4392 road and a disused branch of the Montgomery Canal starts nearby. The community includes the villages of Burgedin and Groes-lwyd. The village itself had a population of about 1,220.

Name
The English name was first recorded in 1278 as "Guildesfelde". It may be named after a person (i.e., "Gyldi's field") or could mean "gold field".

History
In 1862, a hoard of metalwork from the late Bronze Age was discovered near the village. It contained over 120 pieces such as swords, spearheads, and axes.

Notable buildings

Church
The parish church is dedicated to Saint Aelhaiarn, but has sometimes been erroneously recorded as dedicated to Saint Giles, All Saints, and Saint Tysilio. The tower of the present church dates to about 1300. Although the feast of Saint Aelhaiarn is recorded as 2 November, his local fair was traditionally held six days later on the 8th. The churchyard is also listed, at Grade II*, on the Cadw/ICOMOS Register.

Maesmawr Hall and Trawscoed Hall
There are several large houses in the area including Maesmawr Hall which dates from 1692 and Trawscoed Hall from 1777.

Brookland Hall
Brookland Hall, to the SE of the village, is a Grade II listed building and its Victorian garden is listed, also at Grade II, on the Cadw/ICOMOS Register of Parks and Gardens of Special Historic Interest in Wales.

The Garth

The Garth, to the west of the village, was an unusual architectural work by John Claudius Loudon, more usually know for his landscape gardening. The house has been demolished by the remnants of the garden and park are listed at Grade II on the Cadw/ICOMOS Register of Parks and Gardens of Special Historic Interest in Wales.

Sport
Guilsfield has a football team, Guilsfield F.C., which plays in the Cymru North league.

References

Villages in Powys
Registered historic parks and gardens in Powys